Aforia persimilis is a species of sea snail, a marine gastropod mollusk in the family Cochlespiridae.

There is one subspecies: Aforia persimilis blanca (Dall, 1919)

Description
The length of the shell attains 95 mm, its diameter 32 mm.

The large, white shell has a fusiform shape with a pale olive periostracum. The acute spire contains eight whorls, exclusive of the (lost) nucleus, each carrying a peripheral keel. The suture is distinct. The whorls behind the periphery are somewhat flattened, with a shallow constriction just behind the keel. The axial sculpture consists only of incremental lines. The spiral sculpture between the suture and periphery consists of numerous fiat, subequal, strap-like bands separated by narrower, shallow channels. The periphery shows a low, rather wide prominence, giving the effect of a keel and sculptured with several similar but larger, stronger and more distant bands, tending to arrange themselves in pairs, and with a fine, subsidiary spiral striation upon them. This sculpture extends over the anterior half of the whorl, becoming finer and closer on the siphonal canal. The aperture is elongate. The sharp outer lip is thin. There is a wide, deep, anal sulcus on the posterior slope of the whorl about midway between the suture and the periphery. The anterior part of the lip is arcuate, protractive. The body with the sculpture erased is white and polished. The columella is short, twisted, in front obliquely truncate and gyrate, but not axially pervious. There is a touch of brown on the edge. The siphonal canal is wide, elongate, slightly recurved, with no fasciole. The operculum is brown, oval, the exterior imbricately lamellose with the nucleus inside the apical end which is bluntly rounded.

Distribution
This marine species is found from the Gulf of Panama to Southwest Chile. The subspecies Aforia persimilis blanca was found off Cape Blanco, Oregon, United States, North Pacific Ocean at a depth of 1946 m.

References

 Sysoev, A.V. & Kantor, Yu.I. (1987a) Deep-sea gastropods of the genus Aforia (Turridae) of the Pacific: species composition, systematics, and functional morphology of the digestive system. The Veliger, 30, 105–126.

External links

persimilis
Gastropods described in 1890